The 1984–85 Football League Cup (known as the Milk Cup for sponsorship reasons) was the 25th season of the Football League Cup, a knockout competition for England's top 92 football clubs. 

The competition began on 27 August 1984, and ended with the final on 24 March 1985 at the Old Wembley Stadium. The cup was won by Norwich City, who beat Sunderland 1–0 in the final. An own goal from Sunderland's Gordon Chisholm gave Norwich the victory. At the end of the 1984–85 league season both Norwich and Sunderland were relegated to the Second Division. There was serious violence and a pitch invasion by some home supporters at the Stamford Bridge leg of the Chelsea-Sunderland semi-final, and although Norwich initially thought they had won a place in the 1985–86 UEFA Cup, they were denied what would have been their first season of European football by the ban that followed the Heysel Stadium disaster. Norwich eventually played in the UEFA Cup in 1993–94.

First round
56 teams took part in the First round. All ties were decided over two legs.

Second round
A total of 64 teams took place in this round. All ties were settled over two legs.

Third round
The competitors in the Third round were made up from the 32 winners from the Second round.

Ties

Replays

Fourth round
The 16 winners from the Third round took part in the Fourth round. All ties were played over one leg.

Ties

Replays

Fifth round
The eight winners from the Fourth round took part in the Fifth round. This round was played over one leg.

Ties

Replays

Semi-finals
As with the first two rounds, the semi-final ties were played over two legs. Relegation threatened East Anglian rivals Ipswich Town and Norwich City met in the first leg at Portman Road, where the Suffolk side won 1–0, only to be overhauled 2–0 at Carrow Road in the return match. Sunderland, also threatened by relegation, took on a thriving Chelsea side in the other semi-final, winning the first leg 2–0 and confirming their place in the final for the first time ever with a 3–2 win in the return match at Stamford Bridge.

First leg

Second leg

Sunderland win 5–2 on aggregate

Norwich win 2–1 on aggregate

Final

References

General

Specific

External links
Official Carling Cup website

EFL Cup seasons
1984–85 domestic association football cups
Lea
Cup